When the Good Guys Win is the ninth studio album by American country music artist Granger Smith, released on October 27, 2017. The album includes the singles "Happens Like That" and "You're in It".

Reception

When the Good Guys Win debuted at No. 2 on Billboard's Top Country Albums chart, with 15,000 copies sold (17,000 units including tracks sales and streams). It has sold 56,300 copies in the United States as of April 2019.

Track listing

Personnel
Adapted from liner notes.

Dave Cohen - Hammond B-3 organ, piano, synthesizer
Earl Dibbles Jr. - featured vocals on "Don't Tread On Me"
Kris Donegan - acoustic guitar, electric guitar
Mike Johnson - dobro
Rachel Loy - bass guitar
Carl Minor - banjo, acoustic guitar, mandolin
Gordon Mote - piano
Jerry Roe - drums
Jason Kyle Saetveit - background vocals
Jordan Schmidt - electric guitar
Amber Smith - background vocals
Lincoln Smith - additional vocals
Granger Smith - lead vocals
Bryan Sutton - banjo, acoustic guitar
Derek Wells - bass guitar, dobro, electric guitar

Charts

References

2017 albums
Albums produced by Frank Rogers (record producer)
BBR Music Group albums
Granger Smith albums